Jane Wallis may refer to:

Jane Wallis (witch), see Familiar spirit
Jane Wallis (table tennis), represented Australia at the 2006 Commonwealth Games

See also
Jane Wallace (disambiguation)